Carlos Rovirosa Pérez International Airport or Villahermosa International Airport  is an international airport serving Villahermosa, the capital of the Mexican state of Tabasco. It is also commonly used to access the Maya ruins of Palenque, a popular tourist destination.

General Information

In 2021, the airport handled 976,456 passengers, and in 2022 it handled 1,214,190 passengers according to Grupo Aeroporturario del Sureste.

The airport has the exclusive VIP lounge, the Caral VIP Lounge.

Airlines and destinations

Passenger

Cargo

Statistics

Passengers

Busiest routes

Gallery

See also 

List of the busiest airports in Mexico

References

External links

 Villahremosa Intl. Airport

Airports in Mexico
Buildings and structures in Tabasco
Villahermosa